Haribhushan Thakur is an Indian politician from Bihar and a Member of the Bihar Legislative Assembly. Thakur won the Bisfi Assembly constituency on the BJP ticket in the 2020 Bihar Legislative Assembly election.

Controversy 
Thakur is known for making controversial remarks. In February 2022, citing the creation of Pakistan after the Partition of India, he told media that Muslims should be deprived of their voting rights. His party leadership distanced themselves from his remarks and referred to them as his personal opinions. Opposition parties created a commotion in the assembly over his comments, Thakur stated to the media that his statement was aimed at Muslim MLAs who refuse to sing Vande Matram.

References

Living people
Bihar MLAs 2020–2025
Bharatiya Janata Party politicians from Bihar
1969 births